The 2018 Scheldeprijs was the 106th edition of the Scheldeprijs road cycling one day race, held on 4 April 2017 as part of the 2018 UCI Europe Tour, as a 1.HC categorised race. More than thirty riders were disqualified from the race, after going through a level crossing that was closing.

General classification

References

2018 UCI Europe Tour
2018
2018 in Belgian sport